Citiolone is a drug used in liver therapy.  

It is a derivative of the amino acid cysteine. Citilone has also been studied with regards to hypothermia due to it being a hydroxyl free radical scavenger. The drug has been shown to protect hamster cells subjected to temperature conditions of 8-25 °C.

References

Amino acid derivatives
Acetamides
Thiolanes
Thiolactones